Warwickshire County Cricket Club is one of eighteen first-class county clubs within the domestic cricket structure of England and Wales. It represents the historic county of Warwickshire. Its T20 team is called the Birmingham Bears. Founded in 1882, the club held minor status until it was elevated to first-class in 1894 pending its entry into the County Championship in 1895. Since then, Warwickshire have played in every top-level domestic cricket competition in England. Warwickshire's kit colours are black and gold and the shirt sponsor is Gullivers Sports Travel. The club's home is Edgbaston Cricket Ground in south Birmingham, which regularly hosts Test and One-Day International matches.

Honours

First XI honours
 County Championship (8) – 1911, 1951, 1972, 1994, 1995, 2004, 2012, 2021
Division Two (2) – 2008, 2018
 Gillette/NatWest/C&G/Friends Provident Trophy (5) – 1966, 1968, 1989, 1993, 1995
 Sunday/Pro 40 League/CB40/Royal London One-Day Cup (5) – 1980, 1994, 1997, 2010, 2016
Division Two (1) – 2009
 Benson & Hedges Cup (2) – 1994, 2002
 NatWest t20 Blast (1) – 2014
 Bob Willis Trophy (1) – 2021

Second XI honours
 Second XI Championship (2) – 1979, 1996
 Second XI Trophy (1) – 2006
 Minor Counties Championship (2) – 1959, 1962

Earliest cricket
Cricket may have reached Warwickshire by the end of the 17th century.  The Warwickshire & Staffordshire Journal was certainly aware of the sport in 1738 for it carried a report of a London v Mitcham game at the Artillery Ground on 11 August (London won by 1 wicket).

The earliest confirmed reference to cricket in the county is a match announcement in Aris’ Gazette on 15 July 1751.

There was a prominent club in Coventry towards the end of the 18th century which played two well-documented matches against Leicester in 1787 and 1788. Reports of both games are included in Fresh Light on 18th Century Cricket by G. B. Buckley. Leicester won both games by 45 and 28 runs respectively.

Club history
Warwickshire CCC was officially founded on 8 April 1882 at a meeting in The Regent Hotel, Leamington Spa.
The club developed so well that by the time of the first official County Championship in 1890 it was playing some of the top first-class counties such as Surrey and Yorkshire. Warwickshire became first-class themselves in 1894 and surprised the cricket world with wins over Surrey at The Oval and Nottinghamshire. They competed in the County Championship from 1895 but despite being strong in batting, their bowling was, until the arrival of Sam Hargreave and Frank Field in 1899, very weak. From 1900 to 1906 they were strong enough to be in the upper-middle reaches of the table, but the decline of their bowling from 1907 returned them to the lower reaches of the table late in that decade.

Frank Foster, who first played as an amateur left-arm pace bowler in 1908 but improved greatly in 1910 as a result of slowing his pace to gain accuracy, still stands as Warwickshire's greatest all-rounder. In 1911 he headed both batting and bowling averages and, along with a fully fit Frank Field, enabled Warwickshire to take the Championship from the "Big Six" for the only time between 1890 and 1935. Foster and Field took between then 238 wickets, but in Wisden nobody doubted that Warwickshire's win was largely caused by an abnormally dry summer, and the following three years saw them return to mid-table although Foster in 1914 displayed all-round form equal to that of 1911.

In 1919, with Foster having had an accident that ended his short career, Warwickshire fell to last in the table. They did not improve a great deal until the 1930s when Bob Wyatt's captaincy and the bowling of Mayer, Paine and Hollies moved them to fourth in 1934, but as Paine rapidly declined, they fell away. When Wyatt left for Worcestershire after World War II, they declined even further despite Hollies' wonderful bowling in 1946 – with no support at all, he took 175 wickets for only 15 each. The acquisition of New Zealand speedster Tom Pritchard gave Hollies the necessary support and by 1948 they had one of the strongest attacks in county cricket. It was this bowling power, along with effective, if not wonderful batting, that gave them the Championship in 1951. However, as with 1911, they fell off rapidly as their batting became unreliable over the rest of the decade. After Hollies' retirement in 1957, there were some very poor seasons (though they came fourth in 1959 due to Mike Smith's superb batting) until Tom Cartwright emerged as a top-class seam bowler in 1962. The county came second in 1964 but did not establish itself at the top until the late 1960s. In 1971 Lance Gibbs' magnificent bowling enabled them to come second, whilst brilliant batting gave them a clear Championship win in 1972.

Yet again, though, a Championship win was followed by a decline and the next twenty years saw the county almost always in the lower half of the table. In 1981 and 1982, with Bob Willis doing nothing for them whilst producing match-winning form for England, they averaged over 45 runs for each wicket they took – still a record. Only under the coaching of Bob Woolmer and captaincy of Dermot Reeve (with their allowed foreign player being one of Brian Lara, Shaun Pollock or Allan Donald) did the team become consistently successful. Although they had won the NatWest Trophy in 1989, it was their astonishing victory in the same competition in 1993, overhauling a record score posted by Sussex in the final, which launched their most dominant period in English cricket. In 1994 they secured a historic treble, winning the County Championship, Axa Equity & Law League (later the National Cricket League and Pro40) and Benson & Hedges Cup. In that season Lara set the world record for a first-class cricket score of 501 whilst playing for Warwickshire against Durham County Cricket Club; the team total of 810–4 declared in that match is also a club record. In 1995 they won the County Championship again, and also won the C&G Trophy. This was to be the last trophy of Dermot Reeve's captaincy with him stepping down during the 1996 season, Bob Woolmer also having moved on to coach South Africa. 1997 saw them lifting the AXA league trophy once again, but this proved to be a false dawn. Performances for the next few years were poor, including relegation to the second division of the County Championship and National Cricket leagues.

However they have since been promoted in both competitions (though relegated again in the National Cricket League), won the Benson & Hedges Cup in 2002 and strong performances with the bat saw the county reclaim the County Championship in 2004. Warwickshire were once again promoted in the national cricket league and played in the top division of both competitions in 2006.

Until the year 2005, the club captain was Nick Knight, the coach was John Inverarity, and the Chief Executive was Dennis Amiss, though all three stepped down at the end of the season. Heath Streak was appointed as captain for the 2006 and 2007 seasons, but resigned after one game of the 2007 season on 25 April 2007, and Darren Maddy replaced Streak as captain.

The 2007 Championship season was a big disaster for Warwickshire, who were relegated to Division Two, after not winning a single game since they topped the table in early May. They also got relegated from Pro40 league, a matter made worse when local rivals Worcestershire CCC clinched the title.

Since the end of the disastrous 2007 season, Warwickshire made several changes to the team and management staff. Controversial coach Mark Greatbatch was sacked and Ashley Giles replaced him as Director of Cricket. Former Warwickshire Bear and South Africa international Allan Donald joined the Bears' coaching staff. Fans favourite Dougie Brown also took up an Academy Coaching role. After a successful campaign in Division 2, the Bears were promoted back to the top flight after only a season's absence in September 2008.

Maddy stepped down from the captaincy in November 2008. Ian Westwood was announced as his replacement. In 2009 Indian seamer Sreesanth replaced Jeetan Patel, who was busy with national duties for New Zealand, to become the first Indian to join the club. Westwood, in turn, stepped down as captain at the end of the 2010 season. Jim Troughton took over as captain shortly after, before struggling with injury during the 2014 season. Varun Chopra stood in before Troughton retired from first-class cricket in 2015, promoting Chopra to permanent captain.

Early in 2016, Varun Chopra resigned the captaincy in order to focus on batting, with Ian Bell taking over as captain.

At the end of the 2016 season despite winning the Royal London Cup earlier in the season, Director of Cricket Dougie Brown was replaced by Jim Troughton as Head Coach with former Director of Cricket Ashley Giles returning to Edgbaston to take responsibility for all cricket associated with Warwickshire. Bell resigned as captain on 20 August 2017.

Twenty20 Cup history

2003

Warwickshire's first-ever game in Twenty20 cricket was against Somerset at Taunton, where the Bears defeated the Sabres by 19 runs. This result was followed by wins over Worcestershire (by 20 runs), Glamorgan (by 68 runs), and Northamptonshire (by 54 runs). Gloucestershire, who finished first in the division, were the only team to beat the Bears when they won by 8 wickets at Edgbaston. This meant that Warwickshire finished second in the Midlands, West and Wales Division behind Gloucestershire, and qualified for the finals day as the best runner-up.

The finals day was held on 19 July at Trent Bridge, Nottingham. Warwickshire met Leicestershire in their semi-final, who they defeated by 7 wickets, with Trevor Penney top-scoring for the Bears with 43 runs. Surrey claimed victory over Gloucestershire in their semi-final to set up a Surrey-Warwickshire final. Unfortunately, Warwickshire were unable to perform in the final and only scored 115 runs. Surrey managed to score 119 runs in just 11 overs and claimed victory.

2004

With expectations high at Edgbaston, Warwickshire entertained Somerset in the first clash of the 2004 season. The Bears secured victory by 7 wickets. After Warwickshire lost to Glamorgan (by 26 runs), things started to look bad for the Bears. Defeats against Worcestershire (by 3 wickets), and Northamptonshire (by 4 wickets), left the team in danger of not qualifying for the Quarter-Finals, but victory over Gloucestershire (by 2 wickets) on the last day, meant that Warwickshire qualified as one of the best third-placed team.

The Bears drew Glamorgan in the quarter-finals. Although they had managed to beat Glamorgan at Cardiff once, Warwickshire were not able to achieve victory again, and lost by 5 wickets to the Dragons, who progressed to the finals day, and eventually went out to the 2004 victors, the Leicestershire Foxes.

2005

With changes to the format for the 2005 season, Warwickshire now had to play 8 games in the group stage to qualify. Their first game of the season was against Worcestershire at New Road, where the Bears lost by only 1 run. This was followed by defeats to Northamptonshire (by 38 runs), and another 1-run defeat to Worcestershire. Warwickshire secured qualification from the MMW division in second after victories over Glamorgan (by 20 runs and by 4 runs) Somerset (by 47 runs) Northamptonshire (by 41 runs), and a no-result against Gloucestershire.

Warwickshire bowed out of the competition in the quarter-final to Surrey. After sharing a nail-biting draw (Surrey 149 (20 Overs), Warwickshire 115 (15 Overs)), a bowl off followed, with Surrey claiming victory 4–3. Surrey would go on to be defeated in the Semi-Final to Lancashire, who themselves lost in the final to Somerset.

2006

Warwickshire started the 2006 season by playing Northamptonshire at the County Ground, Northampton where the Bears won by 24 runs. This was followed by wins over Somerset (by 7 wickets), Northampton (by 20 runs), Worcestershire (by 11 runs); defeats to Glamorgan (by 6 wickets), Gloucestershire (by 3 runs), Worcestershire (by 4 runs), and a no-result against Glamorgan. Warwickshire secured third position in the table, but their record was worse than both Yorkshire and Kent (who both finished third in their respected leagues), so did not qualify for the quarter-final.

The final's day was once again controlled by Leicestershire, who beat Nottinghamshire in a spectacular final that lasted to the last over of the game.

2007

Warwickshire recruited the services of twice winner, and Twenty20 expert Darren Maddy for the 2007 season, and his expertise helped the team to once again reach the quarter-finals of the competition. The Bears started with a victory over Somerset by 7 runs. This was followed by wins against Glamorgan (by 3 runs and by 9 runs) Northamptonshire (by 12 runs), Gloucestershire (by 27 runs), defeats against Northamptonshire (by 4 wickets), Worcestershire (by 13 runs), and no results against Worcestershire. The Bears qualified as the MMW leaders, with 11 points from 8 games.

In the quarter-final, Warwickshire hosted Lancashire in an entertaining game. After Lancashire set the Bears 194 to win, Warwickshire were able to claw back to 187 for 7, and lost by 7 runs. It was Lancashire who would go through to face Gloucestershire, Sussex, and Kent on the Finals day, held at Edgbaston in August.

2012

Warwickshire finished fourth of six teams in the Midlands/Wales/West division, failing to make the quarter-finals.

2013

Warwickshire finished fourth of six teams in the Midlands/Wales/West division, failing to make the quarter-finals.
After the season, Warwickshire changed their name to Birmingham Bears for T20 competitions. The Bears has been synonymous with the team for many years and will continue to play under the Warwickshire banner in the other two competitions.

2014

The Birmingham Bears came fourth in the North Group (behind Lancashire Lightning, Nottinghamshire Outlaws and Worcestershire Rapids) to qualify for the knockout stages. They faced Essex in the quarter-finals which they won by 19 Runs, to reach finals day at their home ground. On Finals Day, having beaten Surrey in the semi-final, they went on to beat Lancashire by 4 runs to win their first T20 title.

List of captains

Players

Current squad
 No. denotes the player's squad number, as worn on the back of their shirt.
  denotes players with international caps.
  denotes a player who has been awarded a county cap.

Notable Warwickshire players

England

    Dennis Amiss
    Bob Barber
    Ian Bell
    Tom Cartwright
    Frank Foster
    Ashley Giles
    Eric Hollies
    John Jameson
    Nick Knight
    Dick Lilley
    Tim Munton
    George Paine
    Willie Quaife
    Boyd Rankin 
    Dermot Reeve
    Gladstone Small
    A. C. Smith
    M. J. K. Smith
    Neil Smith
    Paul Smith
    Tiger Smith
    Dick Spooner
    Jonathan Trott
    Bob Willis
    Chris Woakes
    R. E. S. Wyatt

India
 S. Sreesanth
 Hanuma Vihari

Ireland
 William Porterfield
 Boyd Rankin
 Mark Adair

Kenya
     Collins Obuya

New Zealand
     Martin Donnelly
     Brendon McCullum
     Jeetan Patel
     Tom Pritchard
     Roger Twose
     Daniel Vettori

Pakistan
    Younis Khan
    Waqar Younis
    Mohammad Yousuf

Scotland
     Dougie Brown
     Navdeep Poonia

South Africa
     Allan Donald
     Shaun Pollock
     Dale Steyn
     Imran Tahir
     Monde Zondeki

Sri Lanka
     Kumar Sangakkara

West Indies
 Shivnarine Chanderpaul
 Lance Gibbs
 Alvin Kallicharran
 Rohan Kanhai
 Brian Lara
 Deryck Murray
 
Zimbabwe
     Heath Streak

For a full list of Warwickshire players see List of Warwickshire CCC players.

Records

First-class runs
Qualification: at least 20,000 runs

First-class wickets
Qualification: at least 1,000 wickets

Other records

Notes
 Brian Lara's 501* in 1994 is a current world record.

Birmingham Bears

Birmingham Bears are a T20 cricket team located in Birmingham, founded as Warwickshire Bears in 2003 and rebranded as Birmingham Bears in 2014. They are a part of Warwickshire County Cricket Club and play at Edgbaston Cricket Ground in the Edgbaston area of Birmingham. They have won one Natwest T20 Blast, the 2014 t20 Blast, beating Lancashire Lightning in the final at Edgbaston. Their playing squad and coaching staff are the same as the Warwickshire first-class and List A team, although an additional overseas player is granted for the T20 Blast.

Under the guidance of Dougie Brown and captained by Jim Troughton Birmingham won 7 of their 14 group games, finishing fourth in the North Group and qualifying for the quarter-finals. In the quarter-finals they defeated Essex by 19 runs, qualifying for Finals Day. In their Finals Day semi-final, they defeated Surrey by 16 runs, setting up a final with Lancashire. In the Final they defeated Lancashire by 4 runs, securing them their first Twenty20 title. The overseas players were Shoaib Malik and Jeetan Patel, who finished the season as leading wicket-taker with 25 wickets.

This season captained by Varun Chopra Birmingham won 10 of their 14 group games, finishing top of the North Group and qualifying for the quarter-finals. Once again they met Essex in the quarter-finals, defeating them again by 24 runs. At Finals Day however they lost their semi-final to Northamptonshire who would go on to win the title. Jeetan Patel returned as an overseas player, but was this year joined by fellow New Zealander Brendon McCullum. The Bears also set the highest team score of the competition, scoring 242/2 against Derbyshire in the group stages, with McCullum scoring 158 not out in this game.

Once again under a new captain in Ian Bell Birmingham performed poorly, finishing sixth in the North Group winning just 6 of their 14 games. Jeetan Patel returned as overseas player for a third season, this year joined by wicketkeepers Luke Ronchi and Matthew Wade who both played half the tournament each.

Under new leadership for the fourth season, this time by former New Zealand international Grant Elliott and new coaching in former player Jim Troughton the Bears improved on their previous season, winning 8 of their 14 group games, finishing third in the North Group qualifying them for the quarter-finals. In the quarter-final they met Surrey defeating them by 6 wickets in a high-scoring game, qualifying them for Finals Day. In the semi-final they met Glamorgan, winning by 11 runs qualifying them for the Final. However, they lost the final to Nottinghamshire by 22 runs. Patel returned as overseas player for a fourth season, this year joined by Colin de Grandhomme, with captain Elliott qualifying as a Kolpak player due to being born in South Africa.

Under the same captain and same coaching, with the same overseas players, the Bears missed out on the quarter-finals for just the second time in their history, winning just 6 of their 14 group games. Former England international Ian Bell though finished as third top run-scorer, finishing the season with 580 runs from his 14 games.

Notes

References

Footnotes

Bibliography
 Harry Altham, A History of Cricket, Volume 1 (to 1914), George Allen & Unwin, 1962.
 Derek Birley, A Social History of English Cricket, Aurum, 1999.
 Rowland Bowen, Cricket: A History of its Growth and Development, Eyre & Spottiswoode, 1970.
 Roy Webber, The Playfair Book of Cricket Records, Playfair Books, 1951.
 Playfair Cricket Annual – various editions.
 Wisden Cricketers' Almanack – various editions.
 Warwickshire County Cricket Club Yearbook – various editions (esp. 2004).

External links
 Official site for Warwickshire CCC
 Official site for Birmingham Bears
 Cricinfo's Warwickshire Section

 
Cricket clubs established in 1882
English first-class cricket teams
Sport in Birmingham, West Midlands
History of Warwickshire
1882 establishments in England